The OpenPOWER Foundation is a collaboration around Power ISA-based products initiated by IBM and announced as the "OpenPOWER Consortium" on August 6, 2013. IBM is opening up technology surrounding their Power Architecture offerings, such as processor specifications, firmware and software with a liberal license, and will be using a collaborative development model with their partners.

The goal is to enable the server vendor ecosystem to build their own customized server, networking and storage hardware for future data centers and cloud computing.

The governing body around the Power ISA instruction set is now the OpenPOWER Foundation: IBM allows its patents to be royalty-free
for Compliant implementations. Processors based on IBM's IP can now be fabricated on any foundry and mixed with other hardware products of the integrator's choice.

On August 20, 2019, IBM announced that the OpenPOWER Foundation would become part of the Linux Foundation.

Openness 

IBM is using the word "open" to describe this project in three ways:

 They are licensing the microprocessor technology openly to its partners. They are sharing the blueprints to their hardware and software to their partners, so they can hire IBM or other companies to manufacture processors or other related chips.
 They will collaborate openly in an open-collaboration business model where participants share technologies and innovations with each other.
 Advantages via open-source software such as the Linux operating system.

Power Architecture 
OpenPower Foundation also releases Documentation on the Power Architecture.

Some relevant documents are the Power ISA and Power Architecture Platform Reference.

Hardware 

IBM is looking to offer the POWER8 chip technology and other future iterations under the OpenPOWER initiative but they are also making previous designs available for licensing. Partners are required to contribute intellectual property to the OpenPOWER Foundation to be able to gain high level status.

The POWER8 processor architecture incorporates facilities to integrate it more easily into custom designs. The generic memory controllers are designed to evolve with future technologies, and the new CAPI (Coherent Accelerator Processor Interface) expansion bus is built to integrate easily with external coprocessors like GPUs, ASICs and FPGAs.

Nvidia is contributing their fast interconnect technology, NVLink, that will enable tight coupling of Nvidia's Pascal based graphics processors into future POWER processors.

Open source 
In August 2019, IBM released the tiny Microwatt processor core implementing the Power ISA v.3.0 and to be used as a reference design for OpenPOWER. It's entirely open source and published on GitHub. Later, Chiselwatt joined in as a second open source implementation.

In June 2020, IBM released the high performance A2I core under a similar open source license. and followed up with the A2O core in September 2020

Libre-SOC is the third, from scratch built, implementation of the Power ISA v.3.0, and the first Libre/Open POWER ISA core outside of IBM.

Software 

The OpenPOWER initiative will include firmware, the KVM hypervisor, and little endian Linux operating system. The foundation has a site on GitHub for the software they are releasing as open source. As of July 2014, it has released firmware to boot Linux.

SUSE included support for Power8 in their enterprise Linux distribution SUSE Linux Enterprise Server version 12 (release 27 October 2014).

Canonical Ltd. supports the architecture in Ubuntu Server from version 16.04 LTS. 

FreeBSD has also been reported to have preliminary support for the architecture.

Collabora Online is an enterprise-ready edition of LibreOffice with web-based office suite real-time collaboration, support of the OpenPOWER ppc64le architecture was announced in October 2022. It comes with Ubuntu 20.04 packages and Docker images, and is delivered as a part of Nextcloud Enterprise which specialises in sharing files, writing emails, conducting chats and video conferences.

Members 
Google, Tyan, Nvidia, and Mellanox are founding members of the OpenPOWER Foundation. Nvidia is looking to merge its graphics cores and Mellanox to integrate its high performance interconnects with Power cores. Tyan is said to be working on servers using POWER8 and Google sees using Power processors in its data centers as a future possibility.
Altera announced support for OpenPOWER in November 2013 with their FPGA offerings and OpenCL software.

On January 19, 2014, the Suzhou PowerCore Technology Company and the Research Institute of Jiangsu Industrial Technology announced that they will join the OpenPOWER Foundation and license POWER8 technologies to promote and help build systems around and design custom made processors for use in big data and cloud computing applications. On February 12, 2014, Samsung Electronics joined. As of March 2014, additional members are Altera, Fusion-io, Hynix, Micron, Servergy, and Xilinx. As of April 2014, Canonical, Chuanghe Mobile, Emulex, Hitachi, Inspur, Jülich Research Centre, Oregon State University, Teamsun, Unisource Technology Inc, and ZTE are listed as members at various levels. As of December 2014, Rackspace, Avnet, Lawrence Livermore National Laboratory, Sandia National Laboratories, Tsinghua University, Nallatech, Bull, QLogic, and Bloombase have joined, totaling about 80 members.

At the first annual OpenPOWER Summit 2015, the organization announced that there were 113 members, including Wistron, Cirrascale, and PMC-Sierra.

As of late 2016, the OpenPOWER foundation has more than 250 members.

As of July 2020, the OpenPOWER Foundation reported that it had 350-plus members.

See also 
 IBM OpenPower – a line of POWER5 based Power Systems machines running Linux
 PowerOpen Environment
 List of open-source hardware projects
 Open Compute Project
 OpenBMC

References

External links 

 OpenPOWER's home page
 
 

Linux Foundation projects
Google
IBM
Nvidia
Technology consortia
OpenPOWER
Microwatt